Samantha Chase was a pseudonym used by  Eileen Buckholtz and Ruth Glick.

The books they wrote under this pseudonym were:
Postmark (1988) 
Needlepoint (1989)

References

Collective pseudonyms
American women writers
Pseudonymous women writers
20th-century pseudonymous writers